The Mechanization and Modernization (M&M) Agreement of 1960 was an agreement reached by California longshoremen unions: International Longshore and Warehouse Union (ILWU), the International Longshoremen's Association (ILA), and the Pacific Maritime Association. This agreement applied to workers on the Pacific Coast of the United States, the West Coast of Canada, and Hawaii. The original agreement was contracted for five years and would be in effect until July 1, 1966.

Origins
Prior to the 1940s, the majority of cargo movement in ports were mainly done by hand and required a large number of skilled workers. There were some new technologies that were introduced in order to aid in the movement of shipments, such as rope slings, dollys, forklifts, and even cranes that helped longshoremen take large loads off of ships. However, longshoremen were still needed as they were skilled to maximize the space in each container. The methods of cargo movement differed greatly between each port on the Pacific Coast. Depending on the size of the cargo and what was being shipped, many ports required extensive manual labor of dock workers while others required the use of specialized mechanical cranes to hoist large truck containers off of ships. After World War II, the demand for a more efficient way of loading and unloading cargo brought new technology to ports that would require less workers to move shipments.

Provisions
Harry Bridges, then current leader of the ILWU, designed the Mechanization and Modernization Agreement, which was signed on October 18, 1960. It distinguished between 3 classes of longshoremen workers. Depending on the level of worker, each worker could guarantee a certain set of benefits.

Worker classes
"A" men: These men were fully registered longshoremen and had ILWU membership. They held preference for dispatch in ports and could claim full benefits as mentioned in the M&M Agreement.
"B" men: These men were partially registered to the ILWU. Although they couldn't claim benefits as mentioned in the M&M Agreement, they could claim benefits mentioned in contracts, such as welfare and vacations benefits. If the "A" men list were to be exhausted, "B" men would be the next group to gain employment preference.
Casual: They are not recognized as being attached to any aspect of the longshoremen industry and would only work peak days when the "A" men and "B" men lists were exhausted.  These men could not claim any benefits as mentioned in the contracts or in the M&M Agreement.

Agreements and benefits
The M&M Agreement guaranteed employment security for the basic workforce, which were registered union members ("A" men). If there were to be a decent decline in employment due to modernization, there would be a decline in the employment of "B" men and Casual workers in order to prevent the loss of employment to the basic workforce. However, the ILWU asked that the Agreement also shorten weekly work shifts from 40 hours to 35 hours per week in order to accommodate the basic workforce and maintain equal wages among workers. Employers would be able to introduce new technology and device that would improve the ports productivity, efficiency, and reduce the number of labor forces needed.

Criticisms
Although the M&M Agreement, provided employment security for ILWU members, it failed in preventing the Longshoremen's Strike of 1971. The M&M Agreement failed to fully adapt to the introduction of technology and containerization at ports. The introduction of technology greatly reduced the need for labor by up to 90% and employers preferred to employ permanent workers ("A" men) rather than others, thus creating an imbalance between workers and wages. Also dock jobs were being placed outside of port areas and jobs were now being disputed between different unions. Whereas, employers of longshoremen were continuing making a profit from the reduction of labor.  
In July 1971, 12,000 longshoremen walked out on California ports; however, it was deemed a failure since the strike failed to achieve significant economic harm to employers. Without support from Harry Bridges, the ILWU leader, a Los Angeles court ordered all workers back to work. Although Bridges, attempted to reconcile with workers by creating a new contract, the contract failed to live up to expectations and "B" men and Casual workers were unemployed.

Significance and legacy
Since the Mechanization and Modernization Agreement, the ILWU had attempted to bring other unorganized, nonunion waterfront occupations into the union as a means to counteract new technology at ports. The ILWU has since expanded its jurisdiction as to maintain high employment for its members. Although organization of these occupations was met with employer resistance, the ILWU managed to absorb new jurisdiction. The Mechanization and Modernization Agreement of 1960, provided job security to members, but did not extend its benefits to those outside of the ILWU.

References

Industrial agreements
International Longshore and Warehouse Union
1960 in labor relations